Marfell is a suburb of New Plymouth, in the western North Island of New Zealand. It is located to the southwest of the city centre. The Mangaotuku Stream runs past Marfell.

Demographics

Marfell had a population of 1,665 at the 2018 New Zealand census, an increase of 135 people (8.8%) since the 2013 census, and an increase of 60 people (3.7%) since the 2006 census. There were 591 households, comprising 828 males and 837 females, giving a sex ratio of 0.99 males per female. The median age was 29.6 years (compared with 37.4 years nationally), with 459 people (27.6%) aged under 15 years, 384 (23.1%) aged 15 to 29, 663 (39.8%) aged 30 to 64, and 159 (9.5%) aged 65 or older.

Ethnicities were 72.4% European/Pākehā, 39.1% Māori, 4.9% Pacific peoples, 3.4% Asian, and 2.2% other ethnicities. People may identify with more than one ethnicity.

The percentage of people born overseas was 9.5, compared with 27.1% nationally.

Although some people chose not to answer the census's question about religious affiliation, 64.1% had no religion, 24.1% were Christian, 1.8% had Māori religious beliefs, 0.5% were Hindu, 0.2% were Buddhist and 3.1% had other religions.

Of those at least 15 years old, 105 (8.7%) people had a bachelor's or higher degree, and 291 (24.1%) people had no formal qualifications. The median income was $23,200, compared with $31,800 nationally. 81 people (6.7%) earned over $70,000 compared to 17.2% nationally. The employment status of those at least 15 was that 513 (42.5%) people were employed full-time, 177 (14.7%) were part-time, and 114 (9.5%) were unemployed.

Education
Marfell School is a coeducational contributing primary (years 1–6) school with a roll of  students as of  The school was founded in 1961.

Notes

External links
 Marfell school website

Suburbs of New Plymouth